The Prague Section of the International Association for Dental Research (IADR) was founded in 1932 by Karel Černý, Jan Jesenský, František Kostečka, A. E. Loos, Friedrich Neumann, František Neuwirt, and Karel Wachsmann. They were joined in 1934 by Karel Wachsmanns Jr., Jaromír Křečan, V. F. Náprstek, Čestmír Parma, Josef Přibyl, Ferdinand Škaloud, and Hans Wermuth, and in 1937 by Karl Haupl.

Wachsmann Sr. died in 1938, and several other members died during World War II, so that by 1948, there were only nine members of the section remaining: Černý, Kostečka, Křečan, Neumann, Neuwirt, Parma, Přibyl, Škaloud, and Wermuth. The section was forced to shut down by the new regime after the Communist putsch in February 1948. The "inactivation" of the Prague Section was approved by the IADR Council at the 31st General Meeting in 1953. Some of the founding members of the section were honored by being designated as Honorary Vice-Presidents of IADR: Jan Jesenský (1933–35), Karel Wachsmann Sr. (1935–38), Karel Černý (1938-39), and František Neuwirt, 1939-40.

By 1970, there was only one IADR member left in Prague: Anna Placková, who was awarded an IADR "Senior Foreign Dental Scientist" Fellowship. This enabled her to travel to Chicago in 1968-69, and participate in several IADR research meetings while traveling in the United States to visit dental research centers.

Dental organizations
1932 establishments in Czechoslovakia
Medical and health organizations based in the Czech Republic
Organizations established in 1932